Cottonwood Community Center, built about 1889, is significant for its historic associations with the development of Stillwater, Oklahoma's rural agricultural community. The center is indicative of school house architecture that was popular in the late 1800s and early 1900s in the Stillwater community.

Of the four remaining one-room school structures in the Stillwater area, only the Cottonwood has been in continuous use from the time it was built to the present. It has been, and continues to be, an important
focus of life for the rural community west of the town. The other one-room school house in Payne County listed as a National Historic Place is the Pleasant Valley School.

It was named Cottonwood because there was an abundance of cottonwood from which the center
was constructed, using hand-cut wood.

The building belongs to the School District of Stillwater but the community residents do maintenance and repair. The land belongs to a corporation of community residents.

References

School buildings on the National Register of Historic Places in Oklahoma
Buildings and structures in Stillwater, Oklahoma
National Register of Historic Places in Payne County, Oklahoma